The siege of Dara was raised by the Sasanian king Khosrow I in 573 during the Byzantine–Sasanian War of 572–591. The fortified city fell after 4 months.

The Sasanians cut through a hill to divert the city's water supply, and used captured Roman ballistae from the abandoned Roman Siege of Nisibis (573).

The news of the fall of Dara, long a major Byzantine stronghold in Upper Mesopotamia, drove Emperor Justin II insane. Bahram Chobin was commander of the cavalry force in the siege, and was promoted to the spahbed of the North after this victory.

References

Sources
 http://www.iranicaonline.org/articles/dara-the-name-of-a-parthian-city-and-of-a-byzantine-garrison-town-of-the-sasanian-period

 
 

573
Dara 573
Dara 573
Dara 573
Dara 573
6th century in the Byzantine Empire
6th century in Iran
570s in the Byzantine Empire
Dara 573